Woolmer railway station is a former railway station, on the Longmoor Military Railway which served the hamlet of Woolmer. The station was probably situated opposite the end of what is now Blackmoor Road, the station is shown as existing on a 1933 map but its precise location is not shown.

In 1948 the station had two low-level platforms with no facilities, it was the station for the marshalling yard which varied in size over the years, peaking at around forty sidings.
There was a block post, the Army's name for a signal box, controlling access to the yard from the double track which was usually worked as a single track using the up line.

The station was closed along with the rest of the line on 31 October 1969.



References

Notes

Citations

Bibliography
 
 
 
 
 
Disused railway stations in Hampshire
Former Longmoor Military Railway stations